FSM may refer to:

Government

 Free school meals, a social program
 Macau Security Force, Macau's public security body
 Submarine forces (France), a component of the French Navy

Media and entertainment
 FIFA Soccer Manager, a video game
 Fighting Spirit Magazine, a professional wrestling magazine
 Film Score Monthly, an online magazine and former record label
 Free Software Magazine, an American online computer magazine
 Fox Sports Midwest, now Bally Sports Midwest, an American television channel

Organizations

Business
 Fabryka Samochodów Małolitrażowych, a Polish automotive company
 Fenway Sports Management, an American sports marketing agency
 Five Seven Music, an American record label
 Fine Scale Miniatures, a defunct model railroad producer
 Fortuna Silver Mines, a Canadian mining company
 Franklin & South Manchester, a model railroad producer
 Free Spirit Media, a mass media company in Chicago, Illinois, United States
 Fuel Supplies Maldives, a subsidiary of the State Trading Organization of the Maldives

Education
 Fanattic Sports Museum, a sports museum in Kolkata, India
 Feinberg School of Medicine, at Northwestern University, Chicago, Illinois, United States
 Fiji School of Medicine, a tertiary institution based in Suva, Fiji
 Friends School of Minnesota, a primary school in Saint Paul, Minnesota, United States
 Frost School of Music, at University of Miami, Florida, United States

Politics
 Federation of Socialist Youth, a former socio-political organization in Russia
 Five Star Movement, a political party in Italy
 Madrilenian Socialist Federation, the branch of the Spanish Socialist Workers' Party in Madrid, Spain
 Mauritian Solidarity Front, a political party in Mauritius
 Socialist Federation of Martinique, a political party in Martinique

Other
 Football Association of Macedonia, now called the Football Federation of Macedonia
 Foundation Secours Mondial, a defunct American charity organization
 Franciscan Sisters of Mary, a religious congregation in St. Louis, Missouri, United States
 Friends of Science in Medicine, an Australian health organization

Places

 Federated States of Micronesia, an island country in Oceania
 Fatih Sultan Mehmet Bridge, in Istanbul, Turkey
 Fort Smith Regional Airport, in Arkansas, United States
 Fred and Sara Machetanz Building, at Matanuska–Susitna College in Palmer, Alaska, United States

Religion and philosophy
 Flying Spaghetti Monster, the deity of Pastafarianism
 Field Staff Member, a position at the church of Scientology

Science and mathematics
 Fast sweeping method, in applied mathematics
 Finite-state machine, in computer science
 Force spectrum microscopy, in physics
 Folded spectrum method, in mathematics
 Free-surface modelling, in physics
 Frequency specific microcurrent, in pseudoscience
 Samarium monofluoride, by its chemical formula (FSm)

Technology and management
 AN/FSM, a series of electronics employed by the United States military
 Factory service manual, a type of guide for technical products
 Fast steering mirror, a mirror used in optics to compensate for tilt
Fecal sludge management, in sanitation
 Field service management, in business management
 First surface mirror, a type of mirror
 Fixed Survey Meter, a radiation detector
 Flail space model, in transportation safety
 Free software movement, a technology-related social movement
 FSM100xx 5G Modem, a modem manufactured by Qualcomm
 Functional Service Module, a propulsion module on the Soviet space station module Kvant-1
 Functional size measurement, a software business functionality metric developed by IFPUG
 Functional sizing method, an approach to software sizing

Other uses 
 Free Speech Movement, a student protest movement in the United States
 Food Safety System Manager, a profession designation of the European Organization for Quality

See also 
 Food Safety Management System